Vescelia is a genus of crickets (Orthoptera: Ensifera) in the family Phalangopsidae, subfamily Phaloriinae, tribe Phaloriini.  Species have been found in: Japan, China, Vietnam, Borneo and the Philippines.

Species
The Orthoptera Species File lists:
Vescelia infumata Stål, 1877 - type species (locality: Philippines)
Vescelia moorei Chopard, 1940
Vescelia mulu Gorochov, 2014
Vescelia picta Chopard, 1932
Vescelia pieli Chopard, 1939
Vescelia sepilokensis Tan, Gorochov, Japir & Chung, 2019
Vescelia variegata Chopard, 1937

References

External links
 

Ensifera genera
crickets
Orthoptera of Asia
Orthoptera of Indo-China